Rafael Lucas Melo Chauvie (born 19 March 2000) is an Uruguayan footballer who plays as a right winger for Club Artigas.

Career

Club career
After playing his youth years at Nacional, Melo moved to C.A. Progreso in January 2019. On 20 April 2019, Melo got his official debut for Progreso and professional debut, when he came in as a substitute for Alexander Rosso in the 86th minute against River Plate in the Uruguayan Primera División. Melo played a total of four league games for Progreso in the 2019 season.

Melo moved to Uruguayan Segunda División club Villa Española for the 2020 season. In his first season at the club, Melo made 14 league appearances and scored one goal. In 2021, Melo moved to Racing Club de Montevideo.

On 10 April 2022, Melo joined Uruguayan club Club Artigas until the end of the year.

References

External links
 

Living people
2000 births
Association football wingers
Uruguayan footballers
Uruguayan Primera División players
Uruguayan Segunda División players
Club Nacional de Football players
C.A. Progreso players
Villa Española players
Racing Club de Montevideo players
People from Juan Lacaze